Jorge Alfredo Vega López is a Guatemalan male artistic gymnast, representing his nation at international competitions. He competed at world championships, including the 2013 World Artistic Gymnastics Championships in Antwerp, Belgium.

Vega Lopez won Guatemala's first ever gold medal in gymnastics at the Pan American Games in Toronto, Canada during the 2015 edition of the games.

References

1995 births
Living people
Guatemalan male artistic gymnasts
Place of birth missing (living people)
Gymnasts at the 2015 Pan American Games
Gymnasts at the 2019 Pan American Games
Pan American Games gold medalists for Guatemala
Pan American Games medalists in gymnastics
Central American and Caribbean Games gold medalists for Guatemala
Central American and Caribbean Games bronze medalists for Guatemala
Central American Games gold medalists for Guatemala
Central American Games silver medalists for Guatemala
Central American Games medalists in gymnastics
Competitors at the 2014 Central American and Caribbean Games
Competitors at the 2018 Central American and Caribbean Games
Central American and Caribbean Games medalists in gymnastics
Medalists at the 2015 Pan American Games
Medalists at the 2019 Pan American Games